The following is a comprehensive discography of American DJ and producer Porter Robinson. His discography comprises two studio albums, one remix albums, eight extended plays, twenty-five singles, and fifteen music videos.

Albums

Studio albums

Remix albums

Live albums

Extended plays

Singles

Other charted songs

Remixes

Songwriting and production credits

Music videos

References 

Discographies of American artists
Electronic music discographies